Ferdinand Breidbach (born 3 May 1938) was a German politician of the Christian Democratic Union (CDU) and former member of the German Bundestag.

Life 
Breidbach has been a member of the CDU since 1956. From 1962 to 1968, he was state chairman of the Young Workers' Union and subsequently became chairman of the CDU social committees in the Ruhr district. In the 1969 federal elections Breidbach was elected to the German Bundestag, of which he was a member until 1980. He had always entered parliament via the state list of the CDU North Rhine-Westphalia. There he was a member of the economic committee.

Literature

References

1938 births
Members of the Bundestag for North Rhine-Westphalia
Members of the Bundestag 1976–1980
Members of the Bundestag 1972–1976
Members of the Bundestag 1969–1972
Members of the Bundestag for the Christian Democratic Union of Germany
Living people